Ludwig Gössing (born 13 May 1938) is a German equestrian and Olympic medalist. He was born in Dortmund. He competed in eventing at the 1972 Summer Olympics in Munich, and won a bronze medal with the German team.

References

External links
 

1938 births
Living people
Sportspeople from Dortmund
German male equestrians
Olympic equestrians of West Germany
Olympic bronze medalists for West Germany
Equestrians at the 1968 Summer Olympics
Equestrians at the 1972 Summer Olympics
Olympic medalists in equestrian
Medalists at the 1972 Summer Olympics
21st-century German people
20th-century German people